The main Offences against military law in the United Kingdom are set out in the Armed Forces Act 2006.

The offences fall into two main categories, discipline offences and criminal conduct offences. A second distinction is between those offences that can be dealt with by a Commanding Officer in a summary hearing, and those that can only be heard by the Court Martial.

Discipline offences 

Discipline offences are those offences that can only be committed by members of the armed forces or, in a few cases, by a civilian subject to service discipline.

The table below lists the principal discipline offences, and indicates for each offence:
 whether it can be committed by a civilian subject to military discipline as well as a service person
 whether a commanding officer can deal with the offence at a summary hearing (though if the offender is a civilian subject to service discipline, it must be heard by the Service Civilian Court)
 the maximum sentence available to a Court Martial trying the offence. The maximum punishment that a Commanding Officer hearing a charge summarily can impose is generally 28 days in service detention, or up to 90 days with the authority of a Major General or equivalent.

Note: Rehabilitation of Offenders Act 1974 only applies to the sentences of 2.5 years or less.

Criminal conduct offences 

The military offence of criminal conduct covers anything done anywhere in the world that, if done in England and Wales, would be against the civilian criminal law.

A Commanding Officer can deal with some criminal conduct offences committed by a service person at a summary hearing, including:
 theft
 taking a vehicle without consent
 possession of a controlled drug
 criminal damage
 assault and battery
 careless driving
 drink driving
 dangerous or careless cycling

Some more serious offences can be dealt with summarily with the permission of a major general or equivalent:
 assault causing actual bodily harm
 possession of an offensive weapon in a public place
 fraud
 dishonestly obtaining services

Criminal conduct offences committed by a civilian subject to service discipline (such as a contractor or civil servant supporting operations) are dealt with by the Service Civilian Court if they could be tried by a magistrates' court in England and Wales.

More serious offences, whether committed by a service person or a civilian subject to service discipline, must be tried by the Court Martial.

The maximum punishment that can be imposed for criminal conduct is the same as could be imposed by the appropriate civilian court, the Magistrates' Court for minor offences, or the Crown Court for serious (indictable) offences.

Punishments 

The punishments that can be imposed on a convicted service person are:
 imprisonment (in a civilian prison). Offenders are automatically dismissed with disgrace.
 dismissal with disgrace
 dismissal
 detention in a military facility for two years or less (not officers). Offenders sentenced to detention are also automatically reduced in rank to an ordinary soldier, sailor or airman, and forfeit their pay for the period they are in detention.
 forfeiture of seniority (officers only)
 demotion by one rank (warrant officers or non-commissioned officers only)
 fine of up to 28 days' pay
 service community order (only used in conjunction with dismissal, with or without disgrace)
 reprimand or severe reprimand (officers, warrant officers and non-commissioned officers only). This will have an effect on future career prospects.
 service supervision and punishment order (ordinary soldiers, sailors, airmen only). This order, which may be in place for up to 90 days, includes forfeiture of one-sixth of pay and loss of leave, and may also include additional duties, and being prevented from using some facilities (e.g. leisure facilities).
 minor punishments:
 loss of leave (non-commissioned officers and ordinary soldiers etc. only)
 restriction of privileges (ordinary soldiers etc. only). This requires the offender to perform additional duties each day for up to 14 days.
 admonition (ordinary soldiers etc. only). This is recorded on the offenders' service record.
 service compensation order. Requires the payment of compensation for personal injury or damage to property. Amounts of likely compensation payable range from £50 for a graze or severe bruise, to £3,000 for a fractured limb.
Being placed on the Violent and Sex Offender Register for any period, including life.

A civilian convicted by a military court may be sentenced to one of the following punishments:
 imprisonment (in a civilian prison)
 fine
 service community order
 overseas community order
 conditional or absolute discharge
 service compensation order
Being placed on the Violent and Sex Offender Register for any period, indefinitely.

See also 

 Military Courts of the United Kingdom
 Civilian subject to service discipline
 AGAI 67

References 

United Kingdom military law
Courts-martial in the United Kingdom